Arthur Miller House, also known as the 253 East Market Guesthouse, is a historic home located at Nappanee, Elkhart County, Indiana.  It was built in 1922, and is a -story, rectangular, three bay by two bay, Colonial Revival style brick dwelling.  It has a side gable roof and features a one-story front portico supported by Ionic order columns.

It was added to the National Register of Historic Places in 1992.  It is located in the Nappanee Eastside Historic District.

References

Houses on the National Register of Historic Places in Indiana
Colonial Revival architecture in Indiana
Houses completed in 1922
Houses in Elkhart County, Indiana
National Register of Historic Places in Elkhart County, Indiana
Individually listed contributing properties to historic districts on the National Register in Indiana